WWF SmackDown! (Known as Exciting Pro Wrestling in Japan) is a professional wrestling video game developed by Yuke's and released for the PlayStation by THQ. It is based on the World Wrestling Federation (WWF) and is named after the company's weekly SmackDown! television program. Originally released on March 2, 2000, the game received a direct sequel released several months later, entitled WWF SmackDown! 2: Know Your Role.

The first WWF game on the PlayStation to be published by THQ, SmackDown! marked the start of a long running series of WWE video games from THQ, then continued by 2K Sports and rebranded as WWE 2K. The game was also re-released under the Greatest Hits budget range.

Gameplay
The game's main story mode contains three main parts, first with the Pre-Season (for created wrestlers), but after ten in-game years of playing the Pre-Season, players are allowed to skip it. However, the season mode is nearly impossible to complete. By playing and advancing in the season modes players gain rewards such as unlockables or attires, but instead of unlocking new characters, players unlock new body parts to put on new creations, to play as that "unlocked" character. Once players build a creation, they must fight in a Pre-Season year to build their skills and make their alliances. Once players finish the Pre-Season, they can never replay it without deleting the custom wrestler, and friends and foes for a creation are set in stone. The story mode contains no voice-overs, instead the characters meet each other backstage with mouths that move to no voice and on-screen cutscene text. The game also lacks play-by-play color commentary.

WWF SmackDown! has many match types including Single, Tag Team, Hardcore, Steel Cage and many more. The game features the late 1999 WWF roster following SmackDown!'''s premiere, including the then-newcomers The Dudley Boyz.

Development
Yuke's, the developer of SmackDown! had previously created the Toukon Retsuden series of wrestling games in Japan for New Japan Pro-Wrestling. Despite this, the game engine used in SmackDown! is not based on contemporary Toukon Retsuden titles, but rather The Pro Wrestling, a title developed by Yuke's as part of D3 Publisher's Simple series and released several months in Japan beforehand.

ReceptionWWF SmackDown! received "favorable" reviews according to video game review aggregator GameRankings.

The game was a bestseller in the UK upon release, and again three months later. The PlayStation version of WWF SmackDown! received a "Platinum" sales award from the Entertainment and Leisure Software Publishers Association (ELSPA), indicating sales of at least 300,000 copies in the United Kingdom.

Daniel Erickson reviewed the PlayStation version of the game for Next Generation, rating it four stars out of five, and stated that "While not quite in the same realm as WrestleMania 2000'', this is the best PSX wrestler to date."

References

External links

2000 video games
Multiplayer and single-player video games
PlayStation (console) games
PlayStation (console)-only games
Professional wrestling games
THQ games
Video games developed in Japan
WWE SmackDown video games
WWE video games
Yuke's games